Khan Sardar Bahadur Khan (8 July 1908 – 31 December 1975) was a Pakistani politician. He was the 9th Chief Minister of the Khyber-Pakhtunkhwa (then called Northwest Frontier Province).

Personal life 
He was the son of Risaldar Major Mir Dad Khan and the brother of former military dictator and president Ayub Khan, (General Muhammad Ayub Khan). He was born in the village of Rehana which is located in the Haripur District of the Khyber Pakhtunkhwa province. He belonged to the Tarin tribe of Hindko-speaking Pashtuns.

He received his LLB Degree from Aligarh Muslim University.

Political career
A member of the Muslim League in the province, he was elected to the NWFP Legislative Assembly from the Haripur Central constituency in a by-election in the Winter of 1939. He became Speaker of the Assembly in 1942.

He was re-elected in the 1946 election. Khan later served as Minister of State for Foreign Affairs, Commonwealth Relations and Communications in the government of Prime Minister Liaquat Ali Khan (Muslim League) from 17 February – 10 September 1949 when he was promoted to full Cabinet Minister.

He served as Minister for Communications in the cabinets of multiple Prime Ministers: Liaquat Ali Khan from 10 September 1949 – 19 October 1951, Khawaja Nazimuddin from 24 October 1951 – 17 April 1953 and Muhammad Ali Bogra from 17 April 1953 – 24 October 1954. He held the additional portfolio of Health and Works from 10 September 1949 – 20 September 1949.

Bahadur Khan served as Chief Commissioner of Baluchistan from 8 November 1954 – 19 July 1955.

After the 1962 elections, he became Leader of the Opposition in the National Assembly of Pakistan during the government of President Field Marshal Muhammad Ayub Khan.

The Sardar Bahadur Khan Women University in Quetta is named in his memory and is the only all-female university in Balochistan.

References

1908 births
Chief Ministers of Khyber Pakhtunkhwa
1975 deaths
Pashtun people
People from Haripur District
Hindkowan people
Aligarh Muslim University alumni
Faculty of Law, Aligarh Muslim University alumni
Sardar Bahadur
Leaders of the Opposition (Pakistan)
Pakistani MNAs 1962–1965
Pakistani MNAs 1972–1977
Pakistani MNAs 1947–1954
Members of the Constituent Assembly of Pakistan